Aleksi Jussi Hermanni Laakso is a Finnish professional ice hockey defenceman who currently plays for Ässät of the Liiga.

References

External links

Living people
Espoo Blues players
1990 births
Finnish ice hockey defencemen